The power gain of an electrical network is the ratio of an output power to an input power. Unlike other signal gains, such as voltage and current gain, "power gain" may be ambiguous as the meaning of terms "input power" and "output power" is not always clear. Three important power gains are operating power gain, transducer power gain and available power gain. Note that all these definitions of power gains employ the use of average (as opposed to instantaneous) power quantities and therefore the term "average" is often suppressed, which can be confusing at occasions.

Operating power gain

The operating power gain of a two-port network, GP, is defined as:

where
Pload is the maximum time averaged power delivered to the load, where the maximization is over the load impedance, i.e., we desire the load impedance which maximizes the time averaged power delivered to the load.
Pinput is the time averaged power entering the network.

If the time averaged input power depends on the load impedance, one must take the maximum of the ratio--not just the maximum of the numerator.

Transducer power gain

The transducer power gain of a two-port network, GT, is defined as:

where
Pload is the average power delivered to the load
Psource,max is the maximum available average power at the source

In terms of y-parameters this definition can be used to derive:

where
YL is the load admittance
YS is the source admittance

This result can be generalized to z, h, g and y-parameters as:

where
kxx is a z, h, g or y-parameter
ML is the load value in the corresponding parameter set
MS is the source value in the corresponding parameter set

Psource,max may only be obtained from the source when the load impedance connected to it (i.e. the equivalent input impedance of the two-port network) is the complex conjugate of the source impedance, a consequence of the maximum power theorem.

Available power gain

The available power gain of a two-port network, GA, is defined as:

where
Pload,max is the maximum available average power at the load
Psource,max is the maximum power available from the source

Similarly Pload,max may only be obtained when the load impedance is the complex conjugate of the output impedance of the network.

References
Lecture notes on two-port power gain

Electrical parameters
Two-port networks
Audio amplifier specifications
Transfer functions